Symphoromyia sackeni is a species of snipe flies in the family Rhagionidae.

References

Rhagionidae
Articles created by Qbugbot
Insects described in 1915